Tosarhombus is a genus of small lefteye flounders native to the western Indian and western Pacific Oceans at depths of .

Species
There are currently six recognized species in this genus:
 Tosarhombus brevis Amaoka, Mihara & Rivaton, 1997
 Tosarhombus longimanus Amaoka, Mihara & Rivaton, 1997
 Tosarhombus neocaledonicus Amaoka & Rivaton, 1991
 Tosarhombus nielseni Amaoka & Rivaton, 1991
 Tosarhombus octoculatus Amaoka, 1969
 Tosarhombus smithi (J. G. Nielsen, 1964)

References

Bothidae
Marine fish genera